Zéphyr (Producteur phonographique) was a Belgian independent classical record label founded and owned by Schott frères, s.p.r.l. (Schott Brothers, private limited liability company), a Belgian music publishing and distributing firm.  Zéphyr was based in the Brussels office of Schott frères.  Schott frères had founded Zéphyr in 1978 for the purpose of showcasing instrumental works of Belgium composers, many of whom in its sheet music catalog.  Since the 1960s, Schott Music had been distributing otherwise neglected recordings from catalogs of other small multinational European labels such as Harmonia Mundi, which specializes in baroque music, and WERGO, which produces contemporary music.

Recording venues 
  Klankstudio Steurbaut, Ghent, owned by Gilbert Steurbaut
 Cavaillé-Coll organ, Chapel, Sacred Heart Institute, Jette, Brussels
 Van Bever organ at the St. Peterskerk, Jette, Brussels

Selected composers recorded 
 Joseph Jongen
 Albert Dupuis
 Marcel Poot
 Flor Peeters
 Fernand Quinet
 Jean Absil
 René Defossez
 Albert Huybrechts
 Jacques Leduc (in French)
 Frederik van Rossum (in French)

Selected discography

Z series

Other labels named Zephyr 
 Zephyr Records of Hollywood, California, founded in 1956 by George Albert Hormel II (aka Geordie Hormel; 1929–2006), jazz pianist and grandson of the founder of Hormel Foods
 Zephyr Records, a small classical label founded in 1997, based in Fort Worth, Texas, and wholly owned by Zephyr Productions Inc., both founded by in 1997 by classical pianist Ian Hobson
 Zephyr Records of Casper, Wyoming, founded in the 1990s by American roots singer Spencer Bohren

References 

Record labels established in 1978
Record labels disestablished in 1986
Belgian record labels
Classical music record labels
Belgian record producers
1978 establishments in Belgium
1986 disestablishments in Europe